White Street–Valdese Avenue Historic District is a national historic district located at Morganton, Burke County, North Carolina.  It encompasses 38 contributing buildings in a predominantly residential section of Morganton.  They were built between about 1885 and 1936 and includes representative examples of Colonial Revival, Bungalow / American Craftsman, and Late Victorian style architecture.

It was listed on the National Register of Historic Places in 1987.

References

Houses on the National Register of Historic Places in North Carolina
Historic districts on the National Register of Historic Places in North Carolina
Victorian architecture in North Carolina
Colonial Revival architecture in North Carolina
Historic districts in Burke County, North Carolina
National Register of Historic Places in Burke County, North Carolina
Houses in Burke County, North Carolina